Mohamed Trabelsi (born 15 September 1981) is a former Tunisian male volleyball player. He was part of the Tunisia men's national volleyball team. He competed with the national team at the 2004 Summer Olympics in Athens, Greece. He played with  CS Sfaxien in 2004.

Clubs
   CS Sfaxien (2004)

See also
 Tunisia at the 2004 Summer Olympics

References

1981 births
Living people
Tunisian men's volleyball players
Place of birth missing (living people)
Volleyball players at the 2004 Summer Olympics
Olympic volleyball players of Tunisia